The Household Fire and Carriage Accident Insurance Company (Limited) v Grant (1878–79) LR 4 Ex D 216 is an English contract law case, which concerns the "postal rule". It contains an important dissenting judgment by Bramwell LJ, who wished to dispose of it.

Facts
Mr Grant applied for shares in the Household Fire and Carriage Accident Insurance Company. The company allotted the shares to the defendant, and duly addressed to him, posting a letter containing the notice of allotment. The letter was lost in the post and he never received the acceptance. Later the company went bankrupt, and asked Mr Grant for the outstanding payments on the shares, which he refused saying there was no binding contract. The liquidator sued. The question was whether Mr Grant's offer for shares had been validly accepted and as such whether he was legally bound to pay.

Judgment
Thesiger LJ for the majority held that there was a valid contract, because the rule for the post is that acceptance is effective even if the letter never arrives. He noted that anyone can opt out of the rule, and that even if it sometimes causes hardship, it would cause even more hardship to not have the rule. Once someone posts acceptance, he argued, there is a meeting of minds, and by doing that decisive act a contract should come into effect.

Bramwell LJ gave a spirited dissent, concluding that acceptance should only be effective once it arrives (but see also an apropos 1974 case, The Brimnes).

See also
Agreement in English law
Postal rule

Notes

Baron Bramwell cases
English agreement case law
1879 in case law
1879 in British law
Court of Appeal (England and Wales) cases